"There's No Place Like Plrtz Glrb" is episode 22 of season 2 of the television show Angel, originally broadcast on the WB network. The episode was written and directed by executive producer David Greenwalt. The narrative of the Season Two finale begins with the group still stranded in Pylea. Lorne has been beheaded by the priests, but is alive as long as his body is intact; he and Cordelia – crowned princess of Pylea due to her precognitive visions – try to escape the castle. Angel struggles to regain his humanity after his experience with his true demon form while Wesley and Gunn lead the human rebels in a revolt against the demon ruling class.

Plot
Cordelia cries over the severed head of Lorne, until his eyes open. She screams loudly, but Lorne calms her, explaining that his race can survive decapitation if the rest of the body remains intact. Silas is pleased to hear that Cordelia is angry and plans to have his guards get the heads of Wesley and Gunn to add to the Princess's collection. Silas tells the guards' captain to go after the humans and to kill the "bloodsucker" Angel. After talking with one of the servants about these other "cows"—humans—running free, Silas blows up the cow's head with a handheld device. He has a similar, but larger machine that can take care of all the cows. Wesley and Gunn wait to have their heads chopped off by the rebels. Before it can happen, guards attack the camp. After the battle, Gunn and Wesley convince the rebels that they are not enemies. Freed, they discuss their plans to find Angel and get home. Wesley offers suggestions for attacking the castle and unintentionally becomes their leader.

Angel wakes to a pseudo-oatmeal breakfast made by Fred at her cave. Angel and Fred discuss the words she has written on the walls of the caves, and Angel suspects she has unknowingly been opening the portals in Pylea. They are attacked by castle guards; Angel is speared repeatedly but fights off the demon change until Fred knocks the captain out with a rock. Fred takes care of Angel's wounds while the captain sits in the corner, tied up. The captain tells of plans to kill Cordelia after she mates with the Groosalugg, and that Lorne is already dead. Angel goes to find his friends, and Fred goes with him to lead the way.

At the castle, Cordelia summons a servant to show her to the mutilation chamber, where Lorne's body is, but the servant cannot. Instead, Cordelia requests the girl's clothes. Disguised as a servant, Cordelia makes her way into the mutilation chamber and finds body parts strewn about wearing Lorne's clothes. Groosalugg shows up and says he hid Lorne's body and put the clothes on another body to fool the guards. Lorne's body is waiting with his family to be reattached. Groosalugg reveals to Cordelia that during their mating, he would take her visions from her, wishing to spare her from carrying such a burden. Cordelia explains that she uses her visions to fight evil and she does not want to give them up. Before they can talk further, she has a vision of Angel's demon fighting the Groosalugg.

Angel and Fred arrive at the rebel camp, offering their assistance to the efforts. Landok arrives with Lorne's head in a large basket, explaining that he was bringing it home to the body. Later, Wesley tells Angel he must challenge and kill the Groosalugg. Angel explains that the reason he fired the gang months ago was because he felt the darkness rising in him and he did not want them to witness it. The demon he changes into is the darkness personified and he is afraid to change into because he does not think he can come back to human after it. Wesley has confidence that he can; he is strong enough to do whatever is necessary. Everyone disperses from the camp to prepare for the attack. Angel plants a torch in the ground and calls out to the Groosalugg for battle. Silas, who had been demanding that Cordelia get on with the "com-shuk" drags the Groosalugg outside to face Angel, lying to him about Angel to make him angry. Led by Wesley and Gunn, the rebels attack, many of whom get killed in the process. Silas attacks Cordelia, blaming her for all the problems of their land, but she decapitates him just before he triggers the device to kill all human slaves. Groosalugg and Angel fight, Angel struggling to stay human, but eventually turning into the demon. Just as the demon is about to kill the Groosalugg, Angel's human side regains control, and he tells the Groosalugg they need to find another way. Cordelia arrives and stops the fight by confessing her love for the Groosalugg.

The next day, Lorne, his head reattached, says goodbye to his family, glad he came back to find out he does not belong. Cordelia's last act as princess is to make a new law abolishing slavery, after which she appoints Groosalugg the ruler of Pylea. With Fred's help, they all return home to LA as Angel's car lands in the middle of Caritas. Far happier than they were before they left, the gang return to the hotel only to find a depressed Willow waiting for them; Angel realizes that she came to tell him that Buffy has died.

Production
To get the effect of Lorne's detached head, Andy Hallett's body was digitally removed from many scenes. In other situations, an animatronic radio-controlled head was used.

Alyson Hannigan's name was placed at the end credits to keep her appearance as a surprise.

Arc significance
 Crossover with Buffy the Vampire Slayer: The team returns home to the Hyperion to find Willow, who reveals that Buffy died in "The Gift". Angel will travel to Sri Lanka to reflect on the tragedy, as seen in the next season's opener.
 The Groosalugg's comment to Cordelia about a pure human not being able to "carry the burden" of the visions and her statements that they are getting worse help lay the foundation for the later discovery that the visions will kill her, and the decisions she will have to face. 
 When Cordelia originally received the power to have visions from Doyle, she tried to pass them on to anyone available, including Wesley when he first arrived in Los Angeles. In spite of, or perhaps because of, having experienced the pain and emotional suffering of the victims she has seen in her visions, by this episode she refuses to give up the power, describing it as "an honour."

Cultural references
 The Wonderful Wizard of Oz: The episode's title is a play on "there's no place like home", a line from the book by L. Frank Baum.
 Lorne sings the opening lines of "Over the Rainbow", a famous song from 1939 film adaptation of The Wonderful Wizard of Oz. It is also the title of the 20th episode of season 2.

References

External links

 

Angel (season 2) episodes
2001 American television episodes
Buffyverse crossover episodes
Television episodes written by David Greenwalt
Television episodes about rebellions
Television episodes about slavery